Günter Blobel (May 21, 1936 – February 18, 2018) was a Silesian German and American biologist and 1999 Nobel Prize laureate in Physiology for the discovery that proteins have intrinsic signals that govern their transport and localization in the cell.

Biography
Günter Blobel was born in Waltersdorf in the Prussian Province of Lower Silesia, then located in eastern Germany. In January 1945 his family fled from native Silesia to Dresden to escape from the advancing Red Army. During the bombing of Dresden, Blobel, then 8, stayed with his family at a relative's farm to the west of the city. After the war, Blobel grew up and attended gymnasium in the Saxon town of Freiberg. He studied medicine and graduated from the University of Tübingen in 1960. After two years service in a medical internship, he moved to Madison, Wisconsin, following an older brother, enrolling in the University of Wisconsin–Madison and, joining the lab of Van R. Potter for his graduate work. Blobel matriculated in 1967 with a Ph.D. He then moved to Rockefeller University as a postdoctoral fellow with George Palade, and was soon appointed as a professor.

Blobel was appointed to the Howard Hughes Medical Institute in 1986. Blobel was the sole recipient of the 1999 Nobel Prize in Physiology or Medicine for the discovery of signal peptides. Signal peptides form an integral part of protein targeting, a mechanism for cells to direct newly synthesized protein molecules to their proper location by means of an "address tag" (i.e., a signal peptide) within the molecule.

Blobel died of cancer in Manhattan at New York-Presbyterian Weill Cornell Medical Center on February 18, 2018 at the age of 81. By the time of his death, Blobel was described as having "ushered cell biology into the molecular age" through his work on the fractionation and reconstitution of functional protein complexes and sub-cellular components in vitro.

Philanthropy
Blobel became well known for his direct and active support for the rebuilding of Dresden in Germany, becoming, in 1994, the founder and president of the nonprofit "Friends of Dresden, Inc." He donated all of the Nobel award money to the restoration of Dresden, in particular for the rebuilding of the Frauenkirche (completed in 2005) and the building of a new synagogue. In Leipzig he pursued a rebuilding of the Paulinerkirche, the university church of the University of Leipzig, which had been blown up by the communist regime of East Germany in 1968, arguing "this is a shrine of German cultural history, connected to the most important names in German cultural history." Gunter was also a founding member of the board of directors of Research Foundation to Cure AIDS, a U.S. not-for-profit research organization.

Personal life
Blobel lost his older sister to aerial bombing of a train she was on in 1945, shortly after the bombing of Dresden, while an older brother survived the war and became a veterinarian in the United States. Blobel worked at the Rockefeller University in New York City from 1968. He lived in Manhattan's Upper East Side with his wife, Laura Maioglio (owner of Barbetta). He was on the board of directors for Nestlé and the Board of Scientific Governors at The Scripps Research Institute. Furthermore, he was Co-Founder and Chairman of the Scientific Advisory Board for Chromocell Corporation. He sat on the Selection Committee for Life Science and Medicine which chooses winners of the Shaw Prize. Blobel had a passion for opera and architecture, in addition to his passion for experimental science.

Scientific awards 
 1978: NAS Award in Molecular Biology
 1982: Gairdner Foundation International Award
 1983: Otto Warburg Medal
 1983: Richard Lounsbery Award
 1983: Member of the German Academy of Sciences Leopoldina
 Member of the United States National Academy of Sciences
 1984: Member of the American Academy of Arts and Sciences
 1986: V. D. Mattia Award
 1986: E.B. Wilson Medal
 1986: Keith R. Porter Lecture
 1987: Louisa Gross Horwitz Prize from Columbia University
 1989: Waterford Bio-Medical Science Award
 1989: Member of the American Philosophical Society 
 1992: Max Delbrück Medal
 1993: Albert Lasker Award for Basic Medical Research
 1995: Ciba Drew Award in Biomedical Research
 1996: King Faisal International Prize
 1997: Mayor's Award for Excellence in Science and Technology
 1999: Massry Prize from the Keck School of Medicine, University of Southern California
 1999: Nobel Prize in Physiology or Medicine
 2001: Pontifical Academy of Sciences
 2001: Pour le Mérite
 2008: Foreign Member of the Russian Academy of Science
 2014: AACR Academy

See also 
 Distinguished German-American of the Year

References

External links 
 Blobel's page at Rockefeller University
 
 Freeview video 'An Interview with Günter Blobel' by the Vega Science Trust
 Official site of the Louisa Gross Horwitz Prize
 Information about Blobel as Distinguished German-American of the Year 2005 (German-American Heritage Foundation)

1936 births
2018 deaths
People from Żagań County
American Nobel laureates
20th-century German biologists
Members of the European Molecular Biology Organization
German Nobel laureates
Members of the United States National Academy of Sciences
Members of the Pontifical Academy of Sciences
Foreign Members of the Russian Academy of Sciences
Directors of Nestlé
Nobel laureates in Physiology or Medicine
People from the Province of Lower Silesia
Recipients of the Pour le Mérite (civil class)
Richard-Lounsbery Award laureates
Scripps Research
Goethe University Frankfurt alumni
University of Freiburg alumni
University of Kiel alumni
Ludwig Maximilian University of Munich alumni
University of Tübingen alumni
University of Wisconsin–Madison alumni
Howard Hughes Medical Investigators
Recipients of the Albert Lasker Award for Basic Medical Research
Massry Prize recipients
Knights Commander of the Order of Merit of the Federal Republic of Germany
Fellows of the AACR Academy
20th-century American biologists
Members of the German Academy of Sciences Leopoldina
Members of the American Philosophical Society
Members of the National Academy of Medicine